John Joseph Boylan (September 20, 1878 – October 5, 1938) was an American politician who served eight terms as a Democratic member of the United States House of Representatives from New York from 1923 until his death in 1938.

Early life and career 
Boylan was born in New York City the son of Patrick and Elizabeth (McElroy) Boylan. He attended the public schools, Cathedral School, De La Salle Institute, and Manhattan College. Boylan was employed as a postal clerk and afterward engaged in the real estate business.

Political career
He was a member of the New York State Assembly (New York Co., 11th D.) in 1910, 1911 and 1912.

He was a member of the New York State Senate from 1913 to 1922, sitting in the 136th, 137th, 138th, 139th, 140th, 141st, 142nd, 143rd, 144th and 145th New York State Legislatures.

Congress 
He was elected as a Democrat to the 68th, 69th, 70th, 71st, 72nd, 73rd, 74th and 75th United States Congresses, holding office from March 4, 1923 until his death on October 5, 1938, in New York City.

Death 
Boylan died on October 5, 1938, in French Hospital in Manhattan; and was buried at the Calvary Cemetery in Queens.

See also
 List of United States Congress members who died in office (1900–49)

External links

1878 births
1938 deaths
Manhattan College alumni
Democratic Party members of the New York State Assembly
Democratic Party New York (state) state senators
People from Manhattan
Burials at Calvary Cemetery (Queens)
Democratic Party members of the United States House of Representatives from New York (state)